Wolverhampton Temporary railway station was a station was the eastern terminus of the Shrewsbury and Birmingham Railway from 1849 to 1852.

The station opened on 12 November 1849 as a temporary terminus for the S&B after they were given rights to run trains over the Birmingham, Wolverhampton and Stour Valley Railway (BW&SV). It closed on 24 June 1852, after Wolverhampton High Level opened just to the south. The station buildings were demolished in the 1970s.

References 

Disused railway stations in Wolverhampton
Railway stations in Great Britain opened in 1849
Railway stations in Great Britain closed in 1852